Robert, Rob, Bob, or Bobby Duffy may refer to:

Robert Duffy (politician) (born 1954), Lieutenant Governor of New York
Robert Duffy (footballer) (born 1982), Welsh footballer
Robert Duffy (American football) (1903–1974), Dickinson College football coach (1927–28)
Bob Duffy (basketball, born 1922) (1922–1978), American basketball player in the BAA
Bob Duffy (basketball, born 1940), American basketball player in the NBA
Bobby Duffy (died 1992), Irish soccer player
Robert Duffy (businessman) (born 1954), American businessman
Robert Duffy (programmer) (born 1964), American video game programmer